Lizabeth Zindel is an American writer, director, and producer, working primarily in the young adult (teen) genre. She is the author of Girl of the Moment, The Secret Rites of Social Butterflies, and A Girl, a Ghost, and the Hollywood Hills published by Penguin Group. She directed and produced the short documentary Keep It Real: Banksy NYC that premiered at the Cannes Film Festival in 2014. She is a member of the Ensemble Studio Theatre, a non-profit membership-based developmental theatre located in New York City where she starred in the premiere of Wendy MacLeod's play The Shallow End.

Personal life
Lizabeth Claire Zindel was born in New York City. She is the daughter of Bonnie Zindel, a psychoanalyst and novelist, and Paul Zindel, a Pulitzer Prize-Winning playwright and author. She has a brother named David Zindel. She attended the Dalton School and Wesleyan University.

Professional
Zindel worked as an assistant at Creative Artists Agency and Maverick Records. She has appeared in People Magazine, CosmoGirl, American Cheerleader, and Justine Magazine. Zindel was selected as a "Flying Start" by Publishers Weekly. Girl of the Moment was selected by the New York Public Library as a "Book for the Teen Age", an annual list of the best titles for teens.

Zindel is a Contributing Editor to Social Life magazine, a luxury publication of The Hamptons.  Her interview with Alexa Ray Joel, Billy Joel and Christie Brinkley's daughter, was featured in the magazine and excerpted in the New York Post.

References

External links
 Author website

Living people
American writers of young adult literature
Wesleyan University alumni
Year of birth missing (living people)
21st-century American writers
21st-century American women writers
Women writers of young adult literature